Kaiky Marques Naves (born 8 May 2002), known as Kaiky Naves or just Naves, is a Brazilian footballer who plays for Palmeiras as either a central defender or a defensive midfielder.

Club career
Born in Santos, São Paulo, Naves began his career with hometown side Santos, initially as a part  of the futsal youth sides. He was released by the club in 2015, and spent a period at Portuguesa Santista before joining Palmeiras' youth setup in October 2017.

On 4 July 2019, Naves signed his first professional contract with the club, until 2022. He made his first team – and Série A – debut on 6 December 2021, starting in a 0–0 away draw against Athletico Paranaense, as the most of the first team squad was already on vacation.

On 9 May 2022, Naves renewed his contract with Verdão until 2025.

Career statistics

Honours
Palmeiras
Recopa Sudamericana: 2022
Campeonato Paulista: 2022

References

External links
Palmeiras profile 

2002 births
Living people
Sportspeople from Santos, São Paulo
Brazilian footballers
Association football defenders
Campeonato Brasileiro Série A players
Sociedade Esportiva Palmeiras players